Samuel David Kreutzer (c. 1894–1 July 1971) was a rugby union player who represented Australia.

Kreutzer, a prop, was born in Brisbane, Queensland and claimed one international rugby cap for Australia.

References

                   

Australian rugby union players
Australia international rugby union players
1890s births
1971 deaths
Rugby union players from Brisbane
Rugby union props